Karimpur Assembly constituency is an assembly constituency in Nadia district in the Indian state of West Bengal.

Overview
In line with the Delimitation Commission, No. 77 Karimpur Assembly constituency  is composed of Karimpur I community development block and Dhoradaha I, Dhoradaha II, Murutia, Natidanga I, Natidanga II and Rahamatpur gram panchayats of  Karimpur II CD Block.

Karimpur Assembly constituency is part of No. 11 Murshidabad Lok Sabha constituency.

Members of Legislative Assembly

Election results

1951–1972
Arabinda Mandal of Congress won in 1972. Samarendra Nath Sanyal of CPI(M) won in 1971. Nalinaksha Sanyal of Bangla Congress / Congress won in 1969 and 1967. Samarjit Bandopadhyay of Congress won in 1962. Bijoy Lal Chattopadhyay of Congress won in 1957. In independent India's first election in 1951, Haripada Chatterjee of KMPP won the Karimpur seat.

1977-2006
In the 2006 and 2001 state assembly elections, Prafulla Kumar Bhowmick of CPI(M) won the Karimpur assembly seat defeating his nearest rivals Arabinda Mondal of Congress and Chira Ranjan Mandal of Trinamool Congress respectively. Contests in most years were multi-cornered but only winners and runners are being mentioned. Chitta Ranjan Biswas of CPI(M) defeated Chira Ranjan Mandal of Congress in 1996 and 1991, and Arabinda Mandal of Congress in 1987 and 1982. Samarendra Nath Sanyal of CPI(M) defeated Arabinda Mandal of Congress in 1977.

2011
In the 2011 election, Samarendranath Ghosh of the Communist Party of India (Marxist) defeated his nearest rival Dr. Ramen Sarkar of All India Trinamool Congress 

Rajib Sekh, contesting as an independent candidate, was a rebel Congress candidate.

.# Swing calculated on Congress+Trinamool Congress vote percentages taken together in 2006.

2016

2019

Due to Mahua Moitra resignation as MLA, By poll was held. Bimalendu Sinha Roy won by 24,119 votes

2021

References

Assembly constituencies of West Bengal
Politics of Nadia district